Noodle and Doodle is an American live action children's television series, which premiered on May 24, 2010 and ended on March 9, 2013. The series was created by John McCoy, produced and directed by Kristopher Updike.  The series was the first long form television series on Sprout (Universal Kids).

Production
The show began production in 2010. It was originally launched by Enthusiastic Productions. The series was produced by Kristofer Updike and (from 2010-2017) Grooters Productions. The show was filmed in Holland, Michigan at Hope College, and Philadelphia, PA with some scenes filmed around West Michigan and Philadelphia.

Format
The show began with a double-decker bus driving around West Michigan and Southeastern Pennsylvania, driven by Sean Roach. Sean then visited a family to get ideas for a recipe and a craft. Doodle then drew out a "blueprint" for what Sean could make. He taught the viewing audience how to make healthy recipes and crafts step-by-step.

There was also an animated segment called "Doggity's", where Sean's pet beagle, Doggity, also makes a recipe with his other dog friends in a restaurant in Doggity's imagination.

Sometimes, Sean and the children would recycle an object from the recipe to use for a craft.

Characters
 Sean (played by Sean Roach) is the host of the show, driver of the bus, and the person who made the recipes and crafts.
 Noodle McNoodle (performed by Bianca Goode in Season 1 and Stacy Nesbit in Season 2) is a lovable puppet of indeterminate species who assists Sean on making and cooking recipes and likes to use her "noodle." In specific episodes, Noodle McNoodle can dress up in different costumes to match the theme of the episode.
 Doodle is a virtual bus-shaped computer who creates the recipe and craft ideas.
 Doggity (voiced by Lucien Dodge) is Sean's pet beagle who lives on the bus in the live-action segment and becomes animated as a chef in a restaurant within his imagination. At the end of every cartoon short he would say "Now that's doggone good" and would wink.
 Deedledee (voiced by Alison Brie) is a poodle who is seen in the "Doggity's" segments working as a waitress. She would be the one who tells Doggity who has just ordered something at the restaurant.
 Mack (voiced by Kevin Smith) is a bulldog who is seen in the "Doggity's" segments working as a cook. When Mack tries to make a dish for the customers that just ordered, he would accidentally make a mess and he would quote: "I'll get the mop again." After Doggity makes the dish for the specific customers, Mack would quote: "It'll never work" as Deedledee tells him that he keeps saying it. In the "Moms" episode, Mack quoted: "It might just work" as Deedledee remarks: "Wow, Mack! You never say that!"
 Tony (voiced by Tim Whitnall) is a pug with a sea captain motive who is seen in the "Doggity's" segments working as a cook. When it comes to the customers' recent orders, Tony would recap about an event in his life that revolves around that until Deedledee would correct him. Tony would then make a comment to follow up on Deedledee's comment. After Doggity completes the dish for the specific customers, Tony would quote: "Order Up."

Episodes

The following is a list of episodes that aired on NBC Kids and Telemundo. The original air dates for the then-Sprout episodes are unknown.

Series overview

Season 1 (2010)

Season 2 (2012–2013)

Broadcast

The series aired on Sprout in the United States, and TVOKids and Knowledge Kids in Canada.

References

External links
 

2010s American children's television series
2010s preschool education television series
2010 American television series debuts
2013 American television series endings
American preschool education television series
American television shows featuring puppetry
American television series with live action and animation
Television shows set in Michigan
NBC original programming
Universal Kids original programming
English-language television shows